A corduroy road or log road is a type of road or timber trackway made by placing logs, perpendicular to the direction of the road over a low or swampy area. The result is an improvement over impassable mud or dirt roads, yet rough in the best of conditions and a hazard to horses due to shifting loose logs.

Corduroy roads can also be built as a foundation for other surfacing. If the logs are buried in wet, acidic, anaerobic soils such as peat or muskeg, they decay very slowly. A few corduroy road foundations that date back to the early 20th century still exist in North America. One example is the Alaska Highway between Burwash Landing and Koidern, Yukon, Canada, which was rebuilt in 1943, less than a year after the original route was graded on thin soil and vegetation over permafrost, by using corduroy, then building a gravel road on top. During the 1980s, the gravel was covered with a chip-seal. The late 1990s saw replacement of this road with modern road construction, including rerouting of the entire highway.

In World War II corduroyed roads were used by both German and Soviet forces on the Eastern Front.

In slang use, corduroy road can also refer to a road in ill repair, having many potholes, ruts, or surface swellings. This should not be confused with a washboard road.

Historical uses

The earliest recorded use of a corduroy road in England was during the Norman attack on Saxon resistance leader Hereward the Wake who had taken refuge in the marshes on the Isle of Ely. Two contemporary sources say that the Normans built a corduroy road one mile long to try to reach him in 1071 but eventually succeeded in their attack using treachery.

Corduroy roads were used extensively in the American Civil War between Shiloh and Corinth after the Battle of Shiloh, and in Sherman's march through the Carolinas.

In the Pacific Northwest roads built of spaced logs similar to widely spaced "army track" were the mainstay of local logging practices and were called skid roads. Two of these, respectively on the outskirts of the mill towns of Seattle and Vancouver, which had become concentrations of bars and logger's slums, were the origin of the more widespread meaning of "skid road" and its derivative skid row, referring to a poor area.

The Hull's Trace is a military road, built at the beginning of the War of 1812, running from Urbana, Ohio, to Detroit of which a part was a corduroy road. This segment, the only known extant portion of the Trace, contains the remains of the corduroy road segment. It is located in Brownstown, Michigan. It is on public display at the River Raisin National Battlefield Park.

By the early 1800s, a corduroy road had been built along what is now King Street in Waterloo, Ontario in Canada; its remains were unearthed under the roadway in 2016. The road was probably built by Mennonite settlers between the late 1790s and 1816. A historian explained that the road had been built for access to a mill but was also "one of the first roads cut through (the woods) so people could start settling the area".

Similar types of road 

The puncheon or plank road uses hewn boards instead of logs, resulting in a smoother and safer surface.

Origin 
The name "corduroy road" refers to the road's ridged appearance similar to corduroy fabric.

See also 
 Boardwalk
 Corduroy Road Remains
 Footbridge

References

External links

Types of roads
Plank road